Lumley v. Gye [1853] EWHC QB J73 is a foundational English tort law case, heard in 1853, in the field of economic tort. It held that one may claim damages from a third person who interferes in the performance of a contract by another.

Arising out of the same facts is also Lumley v Wagner, where Mr Lumley successfully secured an injunction from Ms Wagner against performing for Mr Gye further.

Facts
The singer Johanna Wagner was engaged by Benjamin Lumley to sing exclusively at Her Majesty's Theatre for three months. Frederick Gye, who ran Covent Garden Theatre, induced her to break her contract with Mr. Lumley by promising to pay her more. Although an injunction was issued to prevent her singing at Covent Garden, Gye persuaded her to disregard it.  Lumley therefore sued Gye for damages in respect of the income he had lost.

Judgment
Crompton J held that Lumley could claim damages from Gye. He observed that although the general law is there is no action, by then it had become clear that a claim lay for wrongfully and maliciously enticing a person to break their contract with another.

Wightman J and Erle J concurred.

See also

UK labour law
English tort law

Notes

English tort case law
United Kingdom labour case law
1853 in case law
1853 in British law
Court of King's Bench (England) cases